Polly Fogleman House is a historic home located near Burlington, Alamance County, North Carolina. It was built about 1825, and is a tall -story log house measuring 24 feet, 9 inches by 16 feet. It has a rear shed roofed addition and stone and brick chimney. Also on the property are the contributing fruit drying kiln, a -story log storage building with an attached open woodshed, and a small log building.

It was added to the National Register of Historic Places in 1993.

References

Log houses in the United States
Houses on the National Register of Historic Places in North Carolina
Houses completed in 1825
Houses in Alamance County, North Carolina
National Register of Historic Places in Alamance County, North Carolina
Log buildings and structures on the National Register of Historic Places in North Carolina